S. V. Subbaiah (1920-1980) was an Indian actor who featured mainly in Tamil-language plays and films. He featured mostly in character roles that communicated emotional feelings.

Early life 
Subbaiah hails from Sengottai in Tirunelveli district of Tamil Nadu, India. Spurning academic pursuits, he joined a drama troupe called ‘Senkottai Ananda Sakthivel Paramananda Boys Company’ when he was 11 years old. Later, he was part of drama troupes such as Balashanmukhananda Sabha and Sakthi Nataka Sabha. Subbaiah's performance as Kavi Anandar in S. D. Sundharam's play Kaviyin Kanavu staged by Sakthi Nataka Sabha in 1945 fetched rave reviews. This paved the way for him to enter Tamil films.

Film career 
His first film was Vijayalakshmi (1946) produced by Pragathi Pictures, the forerunner of AVM Productions. Next he featured in Kanjan (1947) produced by Jupiter Pictures and directed by Kovai Ayyamuthu and T. R. Gopu. Then, he featured as Sakuni in Abhimanyu in which M. G. Ramachandran donned the role of Arjuna.

Subbaiah's breakthrough came with the film Kaalam Maari Pochu (1956) in which he featured in a character role. This set the tone for his type of role in future films. Though there are many films that his role remains ever-green among Tamil film lovers, the role he played in the historical film Kappalottiya Thamizhan (1961) will lie deep down in their minds. He featured as Subramania Bharati in this film. His style as Bharati was followed by many artistes, right from Sivaji Ganesan to Kamal Haasan, in the role of Bharati, in future films.

Subbaiah produced a film Kaaval Dheivam under his own banner Ambal Productions. The film featured big-time stars like Sivaji Ganesan, R. Muthuraman, T. S. Balaiah, M. N. Nambiar, Nagesh and V. K. Ramasamy in well defined roles. Most of them appeared as guest artistes.

Sivakumar and Lakshmi starred in this film. Sivaji Ganesan refused to receive any payment for his role. A sentimental Subbaiah said "In my next birth I will become a dog and serve Sivaji Ganesan". Such was his humble persona.

Personal life 
Subbaiah was interested in agriculture. He bought lands in Karanodai near Sengundram (Red Hills) and developed it into a farm. When he was not occupied with film shooting, he worked on his farm.
He was deeply religious and lived his life with certain principles, such as not working after 9 p.m. He was a voracious reader and a fan of Jayakanthan.

He died on 29 January 1980 due to ill health. It was a strange coincidence that the man born at Sengottai, which means Red Fort, died at his farm in Sengundram which means Red Hills.

Filmography

References

Bibliography 
S. V. Subbaiah (in Tamil) (in Tamil)

External links 

1980 deaths
People from Tirunelveli district
Male actors in Tamil cinema
20th-century Indian male actors
Indian male film actors
Male actors from Tamil Nadu
1920 births